Lake Ontelaunee is a  reservoir in Berks County, Pennsylvania owned by the City of Reading.  The lake was created in 1926 by the damming of Maiden Creek to extend and improve the water supply to the city. A large dedication ceremony was held in 1929.
In addition, the lake provides a venue for hunters, fishermen, and hikers.  The lake supports a large and varied fish population including panfish, largemouth bass, common carp, bullhead catfish, channel catfish, alewife, white perch, chain pickerel, and a small northern pike population, and others.  No boats are allowed on this lake and there is also no swimming allowed.

Blue Marsh Lake is the largest lake in Berks County, making Lake Ontelaunee the second-largest lake.  Blue Marsh is also an artificial reservoir.

References

External links 
Fisheries management field report

Ontelaunee
Protected areas of Berks County, Pennsylvania
Bodies of water of Berks County, Pennsylvania